Dwight Filley Davis Sr. (July 5, 1879 – November 28, 1945) was an American tennis player and politician. He is best remembered as the founder of the Davis Cup international tennis competition. He was the Assistant Secretary of War from 1923 to 1925 and Secretary of War from 1925 to 1929.

Biography

Dwight Filley Davis was born in St. Louis, Missouri, on July 5, 1879.  His grandfather, Oliver Dwight Filley, was mayor of St. Louis from 1858 to 1861.  A cousin, Chauncey Ives Filley, served as mayor of St. Louis from 1863 to 1864.

He reached the All-Comers final for the Men's Singles title at the US Championships in 1898 and 1899. He then teamed up with Holcombe Ward and won the Men's Doubles title at the championships for three years in a row from 1899 to 1901. Davis and Ward were also Men's Doubles runners-up at Wimbledon in 1901. Davis also won the American intercollegiate singles championship of 1899 as a student at Harvard College.

In 1900 Davis developed the structure for, and donated a silver bowl to go to the winner of, a new international tennis competition designed by him and three others known as the International Lawn Tennis Challenge, which was later renamed the Davis Cup in his honor. He was a member of the US team that won the first two competitions in 1900 and 1902, and was also the captain of the 1900 team.

He participated in the 1904 Summer Olympics. He was eliminated in the second round of the singles tournament. In the doubles tournament he and his partner Ralph McKittrick lost in the quarter-finals.

He was inducted into the National Tennis Hall of Fame (now known as the International Tennis Hall of Fame) in 1956 in recognition of his contributions to the sport both as a player and an administrator.

Political service

Davis was educated at Washington University Law School, though he was never a practicing attorney. He was, however, politically active in his home town of St. Louis and served as the city's public parks commissioner from 1911 to 1915. During his tenure, he expanded athletic facilities and created the first municipal tennis courts in the United States. He served under President Calvin Coolidge as Assistant Secretary of War (1923–1925) and as Secretary of War (1925–1929). He then served as Governor General of the Philippines (1929–1932) under Herbert Hoover.

Army service
Davis trained at the Preparedness Movement Citizens' Military Training Camp in 1915. From 1916 to 1917 he toured Europe as part of the Rockefeller War Relief Board. With war declared Davis enlisted as a private in the  Missouri National Guard and was commissioned in August 1917.

Going to France, Davis was promoted to Major and became adjutant of the 69th Infantry Brigade of the 35th Infantry Division.  During this period he was awarded the Distinguished Service Cross.  After the war he was a Colonel in the Army Reserves.

In 1942 Davis was the first and only Director General of the short lived Army Specialist Corps. On the disbandment of the unit became an advisor with the rank of Major General.

Personal life
His first wife, Helen Brooks, whom he married in 1905, died in 1932.  He married Pauline Sabin in 1936. He wintered in Florida from 1933 until his death, living at Meridian Plantation, near Tallahassee.

Death

Davis died at his home in Washington, D.C. on November 28, 1945, after a six-month illness. He was buried at Arlington National Cemetery.

Legacy
His daughter Alice Brooks Davis was married to the British Ambassador to the United States Sir Roger Makins. Another daughter, Cynthia Davis, was married to banker William McChesney Martin, Jr., the longest-serving Federal Reserve director (1951–1970) who served under five presidents (Truman to Nixon).

Davis was honored with a star on the St. Louis Walk of Fame.

References

External links

Generals of World War II

1879 births
1945 deaths
Military personnel from St. Louis
19th-century American people
19th-century male tennis players
20th-century American politicians
American athlete-politicians
American male tennis players
American military personnel of World War I
Burials at Arlington National Cemetery
Coolidge administration cabinet members
Dwight
Founders of sporting institutions
Governors-General of the Philippine Islands
Grand Slam (tennis) champions in men's doubles
Harvard Crimson men's tennis players
Harvard College alumni
History of tennis
International Tennis Hall of Fame inductees
Missouri National Guard personnel
Missouri Republicans
Olympic tennis players of the United States
Organization founders
Recipients of the Distinguished Service Cross (United States)
Tennis players from St. Louis
Tennis players at the 1904 Summer Olympics
United States National champions (tennis)
United States Army colonels
United States Army reservists
United States Assistant Secretaries of War
United States Secretaries of War
Washington, D.C., Republicans
Washington University School of Law alumni
United States Army personnel of World War I
United States Army generals of World War II
United States Army generals
Washington University in St. Louis alumni